Agios Therapon is a village in the Limassol District of Cyprus, located 20 km north of Erimi.

References

Communities in Limassol District